Deborah Fialho Secco Moura (born 26 November 1979) is a Brazilian actress.

Career 
At the age of 8 she made her TV debut in advertising; at 10 years, staged her first spectacle, Brincando de Era uma Vez; and at 11 years, she acted in her first novel, Mico Preto of Rede Globo. For the next four years, she would dedicate herself to the theater, and would make special appearances in serials and miniseries of Globo.

While playing in theatre, such as Sapatinhos Vermelhos, which earned her the nomination for the Coca-Cola Theater Award, in the category of Best Actress Breakthrough, television participated in the episodes "Tabu" and "Mamãe Coragem", Você Decide program, the children's school of Escolinha do Professor Raimundo, in celebration of Children's Day, both in 1992. She then made a special participation in the miniseries Contos de Verão and was in the assembly of the play O Soldadinho de Chumbo. She then staged A Roupa Nova do Imperador, 1994, when she moved to TV Cultura, where she starred in the series Confissões de Adolescente, in the shoes of the clever Carol, a job that catapulted her to fame, earned her recognition, and earned her the APCA Award in the category of Breakthrough Actress.

In 1995, she returned to Rede Globo, where she remains until the present day with exclusive contract of artist of the first step, and acted in her first novel of prime time, A Próxima Vítima. In 1996 she played Barbara's spirited novel Vira-Lata, who for a good part of the plot pretends to be a boy, given the name Tatu. Later, she appeared in the novel Zazá, like Dora, granddaughter of the protagonist lived by Fernanda Montenegro, and, in 1998, acted in her first novel of the six, Era uma Vez..., like Emília, mischievous girl who lives in the interior.

In 1999, she participated in the novel Suave Veneno, as WAGs. In August of that year, she posed for the first time for the Brazilian edition of Playboy magazine, in the magazine's 24-year anniversary edition. In 2000, she played her first villain in novels, the Iris of Laços de Família. In 2001, she gained her first protagonist in novels, the Cecília de Sá of A Padroeira of Walcyr Carrasco. 

In 2002, she lived again a villain on TV, but different from the other, the vampire Lara, role that played in the novel O Beijo do Vampiro, is comical and clumsy. In that year, she was elected the character of novels most wanted by the viewers. Due to the great sensual appeal and the great prominence in the novel due to the success of Lara, she printed the cover of Playboy in the edition of anniversary of 27 years of the magazine, in August of that year.

In 2003, she integrated the cast of the novel Celebridade, in the skin of Darlene Sampaio, girl obsessed by the fame. In 2005, she played her first primetime character in America – Sol, a woman who tries to make a living in the United States, even if she is an illegal immigrant. The following year, she participated in Dance in the Ice, of the program Domingão do Faustão, being in third place. Halfway through, she broke two ribs. Still this year, she played her third protagonist and at the same time her third villain, the perverse Elizabeth of Pé na Jaca. In 2007 she made a special guest appearance in the soap opera Paraíso Tropical, as prostitute Betina, Bebel's friend, by Camila Pitanga, who appears only to disrupt the marriage of villain Olavo, Wagner Moura, and Guilhermina Guinle's Alice.

In 2008, she co-starred in the novel A Favorita, where she lived the ambitious and disguised recruiter Maria do Céu, a girl of humble origin who does not accept her condition and does everything to rise in life. She has become a girl of the brand Scala since October of that year. With the actress, the sales of the Flip bras increased from 10 thousand to 40 thousand in less than a month. Still in 2008 she made a nude rehearsal for RG Vogue, who chose the actress as the "favorite complete" and "sexiest woman in Brazilian TV".

On March 4, 2010, Folha Online published an article regarding a complaint by the Brazilian Public Prosecutor's Office, accusing Deborah Secco and other 86 people for administrative impropriety. The complaint, upheld by the Rio de Janeiro state court, describes irregularities in Deborah Secco's participation in advertisements by the governments of Anthony and Rosinha Garotinho, with whom five of Deborah's family members would have been involved, according to the complaint, to appropriate irregularly public money. According to the newspaper O Globo, the complaint indicates that Deborah Secco's bank accounts received at least 158 thousand reais in public resources diverted in a scheme commanded by her father. According to the defense of the actress, Deborah Secco, the two brothers and the mother were used by her father, the businessman Ricardo Ribeiro Secco, like "oranges", without their consent; they said they had no knowledge of the bank accounts to which they were diverted R$ 894,000 from the coup. Deborah and her family had all the assets blocked by a court decision.

Also in the same year, she staged the play "Uma Uma Amor Amor", along with Erom Cordeiro, and also participated in the filming of the short film "Como Como Ela" by Flora Diegues. At the end of the year, she returned with the series As Cariocas, being the penultimate protagonist of the series like Alice, a woman who wants to live everything intensely in the episode A Suicida da Lapa.

In 2011, she starred in the film of a former prostitute Bruna Surfistinha: O Doce Veneno do Escorpião, also starred in the short film Assim Como Ela Still this year, she interpreted one of the protagonists of the novel Insensato Coração, the comic personage Natalie Lamour. The personage fell in the taste of the public and was praised even by President Dilma Rousseff. The actress was the second most populated Brazilian of the internet, due to the premiere of the film and the personage of the novel, the actress jumped of the ninth place for the second, being behind only the president Dilma, in the month of January. As a result of the sensual appeal that she had in their respective works, she won two awards for her interpretation of Bruna Surfistinha, at the beginning of the year, one by the popular jury and technical jury. also chosen the Woman of the Year, by the magazine Alfa. On November 30, the actress went on to two awards on the same day for her work on the novel Insensato Coração, and she won both, one in the Extra TV Award, for the category of Supporting Actress and another by Veja Rio as actress of the year. On December 6, the actress received another award, the personality of the year in dramaturgy, an event promoted by Editora Três, which was attended by President Dilma Rousseff as well. According to a note released by Veja magazine, Deborah Secco was the most cited Brazilian celebrity in the year 2011 by the press. That same year, she was voted the sexiest woman in the world by readers of VIP magazine.

In 2012, Secco was elected as one of the 100 most influential personalities of the year by IstoÉ magazine. That same year, she was inducted by Steven Spielberg to work in Hollywood, where she represented Brazil at the 40th AFI Life Achievement Awards, which honored actress Shirley MacLaine. At the event she also met actress Meryl Streep.

In 2013 Deborah Secco recorded the feature film Boa Sorte, in which she gives life to the positive serum Judite. To interpret the character, the actress had to lose 12 kg, getting very underweight, the whole process of weight loss of the actress was accompanied by professionals, the film is scheduled to debut on May 30, 2014.

In 2014, she gained 8 kg for the character from the movie Estrada do Diabo. The feature film has not yet been scheduled for release. Still in 2014, the actress played the stewardess Ines, in Boogie Oogie. She was later cast as the protagonist of Walcyr Carrasco's novel Secret Truths, but left the novel because of pregnancy. In November 2014, Deborah was honored by the 24th Cine Ceará – Ibero-American Film Festival, where she received the Eusélio Oliveira trophy in recognition of her national film career.

In 2015 she would live the protagonist Carolina in the novel Verdades Secretas of Walcyr Carrasco, but during the recordings, she discovered her first pregnancy, fruit of the relationship with the present boyfriend, the Bahian Hugo Moura, consequently left the plot. In 2016, she integrated the cast of Malhação, like the batmanadora Tânia. In 2017, Secco was cast as Karola, the main villain Segundo Sol. In the plot set in Bahia, her character is a former prostitute exploited by her pimp, portrayed by Adriana Esteves.

Personal life
Secco was born into a middle-class family, daughter of Sílvia Regina Fialho, a homemaker, and Ricardo Secco, a mathematics teacher of Italian descent. She has two siblings, Ricardo and Bárbara.

In the mid-1990s, Secco was in a relationship with actor Daniel Del Sarto, but they eventually broke up. She was later engaged to Marcelo Faustini, but the relationship ended before the two married.

In 1997 she met director Rogério Gomes, who eventually became her spouse until their divorce in 2001. After the divorce, she began dating Maurício Mattar, but the relationship ended after eleven months. She began dating Dado Dolabella in 2002, and within one month, the two were engaged and living together. Their relationship ended ten months later and she became involved with Marcelo Faria in 2003. She separated from him in 2004 and began a relationship with Erik Marmo. From 2004 to 2006, she was romantically linked with O Rappa vocalist Marcelo Falcão, whose name she later tattooed on her foot, but the relationship ended and she had the tattoo removed.

In 2007, Deborah began dating soccer player Roger Flores, in a few months they lived together. After two years living together, Deborah married Flores on June 6, 2009, in Itaipava, a mountain region of Rio de Janeiro, in a discreet ceremony. They separated amicably in April 2013. after four years of marriage, with a brief breakup in 2010.

On December 4, 2015, after marrying Hugo Moura, Secco gave birth to their first child, Maria Flor.

In September 2022 she admitted she is bisexual and has dated women.

Filmography

Television

Film

Theatre

Awards and nominations

References

External links

1979 births
Living people
20th-century Brazilian actresses
21st-century Brazilian actresses
Actresses from Rio de Janeiro (city)
Association footballers' wives and girlfriends
Brazilian people of Portuguese descent
Brazilian people of Italian descent
Brazilian child actresses
Brazilian film actresses
Brazilian television actresses
Brazilian stage actresses
Brazilian women television presenters
Brazilian LGBT actors
Brazilian bisexual people
Bisexual actresses